Xireg is a town in and county seat of Ulan County in Qinghai province, China. The town is located in a fertile valley. Wulan railway station and the G315 highway connects the town to other parts of China.

External links
Maplandia

Divisions of Ulan County
Township-level divisions of Qinghai